Eugeniusz Pędzisz (born 21 February 1946) is a Polish former sports shooter. He competed at the 1968, 1972, 1976 and the 1980 Summer Olympics.

References

1946 births
Living people
Polish male sport shooters
Olympic shooters of Poland
Shooters at the 1968 Summer Olympics
Shooters at the 1972 Summer Olympics
Shooters at the 1976 Summer Olympics
Shooters at the 1980 Summer Olympics
People from Zielona Góra
Sportspeople from Lubusz Voivodeship
20th-century Polish people